"Go West" is a song by American disco group Village People, released as the second single from their fourth studio album of the same name (1979). It was written by Jacques Morali, Henri Belolo and lead singer Victor Willis. The song was successful in the disco scene during the late 1970s. "Go West" found further success when it was covered in 1993 by English synth-pop duo Pet Shop Boys.

Village People version
The song's title is attributed to the 19th-century quote "Go West, young man" commonly attributed to Horace Greeley, a rallying cry for the colonization of the American West, but also an invitation to pursue one's own dreams and individuality. The melody resembles that of the State Anthem of the Soviet Union (and later National anthem of Russia) composed by Alexander Alexandrov.

Both the 7″ and 12″ versions of the song were subsequently collected on various greatest hits albums, including a 1997 radio remix which was made in the wake of the success of Pet Shop Boys' 1993 version. The song does share some melodic elements with "Give Thanks with a Grateful Heart" by Henry Smith and later covered by Don Moen.

Record World said that "the disco-pop hook is surrounded by a resounding harmony chorus accentuated by full-bodied production."  Classic Rock History critic Brian Kachejian rated it the Village People's 6th greatest song.

Copyright lawsuit
On May 7, 2012, in a landmark ruling in accordance with the Copyright Act of 1976, Victor Willis was awarded 33% of the copyright to "Go West" and other Village People hits.

Charts

Pet Shop Boys version

In 1992, when Pet Shop Boys were asked by Derek Jarman to perform at an AIDS charity event at The Haçienda nightclub in Manchester, Chris Lowe of the duo selected "Go West" as the song they would perform. Though singer Neil Tennant was unable to remember the lyrics during that performance, the two decided to record it as a single.

Release
The original single version of the song, set for an earlier release in 1992 as a non-album single, was never used. However, both its extended dance mix, and its similarly unreleased B-side "Forever in Love" (an edited version was released on Very Relentless in 1993), were eventually released on the 2001 expanded reissue of Very. Instead, the song was released in a different version on September 6, 1993, as the second single from Very, and featuring the B-side "Shameless". This release included remixes by Brothers in Rhythm, Farley & Heller, Kevin Saunderson, and Mark Stent. The single peaked at number two on the UK Singles Chart and number one in Finland, Germany and Iceland. The single also reached number one in Ireland, becoming the last of the duo's four Irish number-one singles to date, and topped the US Billboard Dance Music/Club Play Singles chart.

Changes
The new version enhances the basis of the original's chord progression in Pachelbel's Canon, bringing the theme to the forefront at the opening of the song. In addition to the Canon elements, it included a new introduction which Lowe later said "does sound surprisingly like the former Soviet anthem". The song also underwent extensive reworking of its instrumental tracks, with producers Stephen Hague and Mark Stent credited for the mixing, as well as an all-male Broadway choir arranged by Richard Niles (said by Tennant to be inspired by the song "There Is Nothing Like a Dame" from the Broadway musical South Pacific). In addition, Tennant and Lowe wrote a new coda and a bridge for the song, with the lyrics:

Critical reception
Stephen Thomas Erlewine from AllMusic felt the song is a "bizarrely moving" cover. Larry Flick from Billboard commented, "Nothing better captures the tone of bittersweet joy and drama that permeates Very than PSB's cover of the Village People nugget, 'Go West'. Covered with thick layers of pillowy synths, the track swaps the male-bonding vibe of the original with a wistful demeanor that's lined with a pensive subtext of loss". In the single review, he described it as a "gorgeous reading", adding that Neil Tennant "gives the happy, male-bonding lyrics a wistful, almost melancholy edge—an odd but successful contrast to the fist-waving chants at the chorus". Dave Sholin from the Gavin Report deemed it an "uptempo, melodic pop winner". Caroline Sullivan from The Guardian constated that "Can You Forgive Her?" and "Go West" "are among the best singles of the year, the latter distinguishing itself by making the Village People original seem flagrantly heterosexual." A reviewer from Lennox Herald declared it as a "90s update" of the disco anthem, and an "outside bet for the top spot".

Liverpool Echo felt it is the "funniest thing they've done for ages", noting that it "comes complete with butch male chorus contrasting with the Pet Shop Boys' sweet and innocent vocals." In his weekly UK chart commentary, James Masterton remarked that the duo's cover "is affectionate rather than mocking but no less brilliant for it with Male Voice Choirs and Gospel Singers adding to what has to be one of the singles of the year." Pan-European magazine Music & Media wrote, "The emperors of synth pop are backed by a Cossack choir. Blue helmets replace the Indian head dress and stetson, worn by the original singers of the song, the Village People." Reading Evening Post remarked that "Seagulls and strings usher" in this version, adding that "it's insistent and instantly catchy, and brings to mind the song "YMCA" even without knowing who originally sang this track." They concluded with that "Go West" "will obviously be a hit". Gavin Reeve from Smash Hits gave it two out of five, commenting, "Neil and Chris have dug up an old Village People hit from the '70s and changed it from a singalong disco number to a... singalong disco number." Jonathan Bernstein from Spin wrote, "It should be camp, ridiculous, and overblown. It is. But it's also curiously affecting. Tennant's wistful reading of the song's yearning for acceptance turns laughter at the surrounding bombast into a lump in the troat. You can only keep it bottled up for so long." David Petrilla from The Weekender said it "sounds like The Village People meet Al Stewart", adding, "expect to start marching in place and finding your arms up in the air when you hear it."

Music video
The accompanying music video for "Go West" was directed by British director Howard Greenhalgh and relies heavily on computer-generated imagery, like all of his videos for the Very singles. It begins with a red Statue of Liberty, and then depicts a grey city where the communist domination is evident on the basis of Soviet imagery such as red stars and red flags, the Yuri Gagarin Monument (a spaceman on a column) and the Monument to the Conquerors of Space (a rocket on a spire-like pedestal). Troops of identical Soviet men march up a staircase stretching into the clouds, seemingly toward a Western society, with the Statue of Liberty, now appearing as a black diva looming in the distance (played by backing-vocalist Sylvia Mason-James). Tennant and Lowe appear throughout; Tennant carries a blue-and-yellow striped arrow staff, and Lowe travels on a flying surfboard. Occasional live action shots of Soviet iconography appear; in one Tennant and Lowe appear in their costumes, walking across Red Square.

The video received heavy rotation on MTV Europe in November 1993 and was nominated for the Grammy Award for Best Short Form Music Video in 1995, losing to "Love Is Strong" by The Rolling Stones. The "Go West" costumes were parodied in the video for their later 2006 single, "I'm with Stupid".

Track listings

 UK 7-inch and cassette single
 Australian cassette single
 Japanese mini-CD single
 "Go West" – 5:03
 "Shameless" – 5:04

 UK 12-inch single
A1. "Go West" (Mings Gone West: First and Second Movement) – 10:12
B1. "Go West" (Farley and Heller disco mix) – 6:01
B2. "Go West" (Kevin Saunderson Tribe mix) – 6:50

 UK and Australian CD single
 "Go West" – 5:03
 "Shameless" – 5:04
 "Go West" (Ming's Gone West: First and Second Movement) – 10:12

 European maxi-CD single
 "Go West" (edit) – 5:03
 "Go West" (Ming's Gone West: First and Second Movement) – 10:12
 "Go West" (Farley and Heller Fire Island mix) – 7:42
 "Go West" (Kevin Saunderson Tribe mix) – 6:49

 US maxi-CD single
 "Go West" (album version) – 5:01
 "Shameless" – 5:04
 "Go West" (Ming's Gone West: First and Second Movement) – 10:12
 "Go West" (Farley and Heller disco mix) – 5:58
 "Go West" (Farley and Heller Fire Island mix) – 7:42
 "Go West" (Kevin Saunderson Tribe mix) – 6:49
 "Go West" (Kevin Saunderson trance mix) – 6:53

 US 12-inch single
A1. "Go West" (Ming's Gone West: First and Second Movement) – 10:12
A2. "Go West" (album version) – 5:01
B1. "Go West" (Farley and Heller disco mix) – 5:58
B2. "Go West" (Kevin Saunderson Tribe mix) – 6:49

 US cassette single
 "Go West" (radio version) – 4:09
 "Go West" (album version) – 5:01

Charts

Weekly charts

Year-end charts

Certifications

Other versions
German metal band JBO covered the song on their 1997 Album  (loud), entitled  (a party), mocking the song.

Remixed Eurodance versions of the song have appeared on the Dancemania series albums, including Dancemania SPEED 4 issued in 2000.

Clubringer covered the song in 2003 with a trance CD single released in Poland. Four versions of the song were created.

The Swedish PSB cover band West End Girls released their version of the song in January 2006. In 2007, classical singer Rhydian performed the song on The X Factor, surrounded by men in sailor outfits.

Austrian baritone singer Patrizio Buanne used the notes and changed its lyrics in the song "Stand Up (Champions Theme)", which was included in some versions of his 2006 album Forever Begins Tonight.

German pop singer Mickie Krause covered the song on his 2008 album  entitled . On the occasion of the UEFA Euro 2008 football championship, he published the chorus melody that directed against the Netherlands' abusive song, alluding to the traditional orange jersey of the Netherlands national football team.

British comedy band The Wurzels covered the song on their 2010 album A Load More Bullocks.

Osem, the Israeli food giant, created a commercial for its ketchup based on the Pet Shop Boys video clip and song version a short time after the single was released.

Hermes House Band released a version in 2006.

Bulgarian comedy band Zamunda Banana Band's  ("Back to Nature") is a parody of "Go West".

The Japanese pop group Beyooooonds covered the song on their debut single, titled "Go Waist". Beyooooonds interprets "Go West" as a waist exercise song.

British retailer GO Outdoors parody the song in a 2016 advert, altering the lyric "Go west" to "Go there".

As a sports chant
Many football clubs throughout the world (primarily in Germany and England, but also Paris Saint-Germain) have created their own renditions of "Go West" to be sung by supporters on matchday. Versions observed in English include "go home to your sexy wives" and others. Borussia Dortmund began this tradition in 1993 with their version entitled  ("Olé, here comes the BVB"), while fans of FC Schalke 04 originated the popular and influential  ("Stand Up, if you're a Schalke Fan"). Also the fans of the Poland national football team and of the Poland national teams in other sports traditionally sing  ("Poland, white and red") to the melody of the song. During 2022 Fifa World Cup Argentina fans started chanting a variation for Ángel Di María ("Fideo lalala lala") which would later be used to cheer for all grandmothers of the country ("Abuela la lalala").<ref>{{cite news|url=https://www.washingtonpost.com/world/2022/12/16/argentina-abuela-world-cup/|newspaper=Washington Post|title=¡Abuela la la la!' Argentina's viral dancing World Cup lucky charm|date=16 December 2022|access-date=16 December 2022}}</ref> 

Irish professional Rugby Union club Ulster Rugby sing their own supporters version entitled "Stand Up for the Ulstermen"

In popular culture
The Village People version of "Go West" features in the film The Adventures of Priscilla, Queen of the Desert and in the stage musical adaptation as the three lead characters leave Sydney for Alice Springs (which lies just over 2,000 kilometres north-west of Sydney as the crow flies).

The Pet Shop Boys version of the song is played in the first and last scenes of award-winning Chinese director Jia Zhangke's film Mountains May Depart (2015). In many of Jia's films, the 'turn' China has made towards 'the West' is a central theme – Mountains May Depart is no exception. Also, the song serves as a unifying element: it connects the first part of the film (set in 1999) to the final scene (set in 2025), creating a poignant effect which several critics have praised; David Rooney of the Hollywood Reporter called the ending "a beautiful concluding sequence that reaffirms the film's aching depth of feeling and extraordinary sense of place".

Sharwood's used the melody for an advertising jingle for an advertising campaign for their products in circa 2008, substituting "Go West" for "Go East".

In 2021, Highways England used the melody in a public information film about what to do in the event of getting into difficulty on the motorway (pulling up left on the hard shoulder and disembarking the vehicle on the left hand side); the campaign was aptly named "Go Left".

Notes

References

Further reading
 (2001). "Go West ". Very / Further Listening 1992–1994'' [CD liner notes].

External links
 Neil Tennant explains the real meaning behind the PSB remix

1979 singles
1979 songs
1993 singles
Casablanca Records singles
Number-one singles in Finland
Number-one singles in Germany
Number-one singles in Iceland
Football songs and chants
Irish Singles Chart number-one singles
LGBT-related songs
Music videos directed by Howard Greenhalgh
Parlophone singles
Pet Shop Boys songs
Popular songs based on classical music
Song recordings produced by Jacques Morali
Songs written by Chris Lowe
Songs written by Henri Belolo
Songs written by Jacques Morali
Songs written by Neil Tennant
Song recordings produced by Stephen Hague
Songs written by Victor Willis
Village People songs